Barratt Developments plc is one of the largest residential property development companies in the United Kingdom operating across England, Wales and Scotland. It was founded in 1958 as Greensitt Bros., but control was later assumed by Sir Lawrie Barratt. It was originally based in Newcastle upon Tyne but is now located at David Wilson's former offices in Coalville, Leicestershire. It has been listed on the London Stock Exchange since 1968, and is a constituent of the FTSE 100 Index.

History 
In 1953, Lawrie Barratt, an accountant who was frustrated at the high purchase prices of houses for first-time buyers, bought five acres of land at Darras Hall, near Newcastle upon Tyne and built his own home on the site. Following this experience, he joined forces with Lewis Greensitt, a Newcastle builder, to establish a house building business, which was initially known as Greensitt Brothers, in 1958.

The company was floated on the Stock Exchange in 1968 as Greensitt & Barratt by which time the company was building 500 homes a year and the growth plan had been "fully achieved". Lewis Greensitt left shortly after the flotation and in 1973 the company was renamed Barratt Developments. The 1970s saw Barratt making a series of acquisitions, transforming the company from a local housebuilder to a national firm building around 10,000 houses a year, and rivalling George Wimpey in size. The largest of these acquisitions were the Manchester firm of Arthur Wardle and the Luton-based Janes.

Central to Barratt's expansion was its high-profile marketing, with national advertising, featuring Patrick Allen and a helicopter. Barratt provided starter homes for the first-time buyer and offered part-exchange to those trading up.  In the year to June 1983, Barratt sold a record 16,500 houses making it by far the largest housebuilder in the country. In 1983 and 1984 Barratt was hit by two successive ITV World in Action programmes, the first criticising timber-framed housing and the latter, starter homes. Within two years, unit sales had more than halved. Lawrie Barratt led a total restructuring of the company, abandoning timber-framed construction, launching a new product range, and concentrating on the more profitable trade-up market. In the late 1980s, Margaret Thatcher famously purchased a house on one of Barratt's most upmarket estates, in Dulwich, London.

In 1991, the company was badly hit by the recession and recalled Lawrie Barratt from retirement: he retired for good in 1997 and remained life president until his death in December 2012. In 2004 the company sold Barratt American, its US operation, established in the 1980s in California. Following the house price boom in the later 1990s and early 2000s, which saw a number of Barratt's largest rivals, such as Persimmon, George Wimpey and Taylor Woodrow all acquire rivals to increase in size, Barratt broke its tradition of 30 years and acquired Wilson Bowden, best known for its David Wilson Homes brand, for £2.7 billion in 2007. This brought the David Wilson, Ward Homes and Wilson Bowden Developments brands to the group.

In 2008, the company secured a restructuring of its banking covenant package. The non-profit Barratt Residential Asset Management division was established in 2012 to provide property management services on Barratt London developments.

David Thomas was appointed chief executive in succession to Mark Clare in 2015. The company purchased Oregon Timber Frame for an undisclosed sum in 2019.

In 2020, Barratt Developments set science-based carbon reduction targets as well as making a commitment to build zero carbon homes from 2030 and become a net zero business by 2040. Examples of sustainable developments include the Green House at the BRE Innovation Park, Hanham Hall near Bristol, Derwenthorpe, near York and Kingsbrook, near Aylesbury.

As of 2020, Barratt Developments had achieved a 5 star rating in the Home Builders Federation new home Customer Satisfaction Survey for 11 consecutive years. In the 2020 NHBC Pride in the Job awards for site managers, Barratt site managers won 92 Quality Awards, seven of the eleven available Regional Awards and Midlands-based site manager Kirk Raine won the Supreme Award in the large builder category.

Operations

UK house building 
Barratt Developments PLC owns three consumer brands: Barratt Homes, David Wilson Homes and Barratt London.

Commercial construction 
Barratt owns and operates Wilson Bowden Developments, which develops commercial property in the UK.

Among projects led by Wilson Bowden Developments is Optimus Point, a 74-acre greenfield site at Glenfield, Leicestershire.

Criticisms 

In 2017, the Daily Telegraph noted "10 purported crashes in just 48 hours" on what they regard as arguably "Britain’s most dangerous roundabout." Derbyshire County Council removed wrecked vehicles from the roundabout at Mickleover which drivers said was poorly lit and badly signed. The council said that Barratts were responsible for the design though it had been checked by their engineers.

In 2019, the UK's Competition and Markets Authority (CMA) launched an investigation into alleged mis-selling of homes on a leasehold basis, with Barratt one of four housebuilders targetted in September 2020. In August 2022, after "careful scrutiny of the evidence gathered", and an assessment that a successful legal case was unlikely, the CMA  closed its three-year investigation citing lack of evidence, while noting "Barratt’s sales practices have changed, and they no longer sell leasehold houses."

In 2020, during remedial work to replace flammable cladding at the Citiscape high-rise in Croydon, defects were found in the reinforced concrete frame of the building. A further review found similar defects in seven other developments. Remediation was set to cost £70m in 2020, but had increased a year later to £163m. Citiscape residents were rehoused in September 2019, and in May 2021, Barratt reacquired the 95 flats at Citiscape from their leaseholders and was in the process of reacquiring the freehold from  a Vincent Tchenguiz controlled company.

On 27 July 2021 an article by The Times Environment Correspondent, Ben Webster, highlighted issues over the approach to biodiversity reporting taken by Barratt subsidiary, David Wilson Homes. in relation to a green field development in the Buckinghamshire village of Maids Moreton.

References

External links 

 Official website
 

 
British companies established in 1958
Housebuilding companies of the United Kingdom
Companies listed on the London Stock Exchange
Companies based in Leicestershire
1958 establishments in England